Magnetic developer is a fluid which makes the magnetic information written on magnetic tape or the magnetic stripe of a credit card or ATM card visible to the naked eye.

Magnetic developer can be found in liquid or aerosol form. When applied to a magnetic stripe, suspended metal particles will be attracted to the magnetically charged regions of the stripe as the liquid evaporates.

Magnetic developer can be used to troubleshoot problems with magnetic stripes and the equipment that encodes and reads them. By making the encoding visible, one can see how encoding head alignment affects the position of the data tracks, and observe any possible magnetic damage that has occurred on the magnetic stripe.

See also 
Magnasee

Magnetic devices